The Dickenson House is a historic residence in Greenville, Alabama.  The house is an example of South Alabama vernacular architecture, with a truncated pyramidal roof topped with a flat platform.  The house has a wrap-around front porch supported by Ionic columns.  A cross-gable dormer with a vent adorns the left side of the façade.  The main entry has Eastlake detailing, a transom, and sidelights.  The interior features Queen Anne details including horizontally-paneled doors and paneled wainscoting.

The house was listed on the National Register of Historic Places in 1986.

References

National Register of Historic Places in Butler County, Alabama
Houses on the National Register of Historic Places in Alabama
Houses completed in 1890
Houses in Butler County, Alabama